SAK Celovec/Klagenfurt is an Austrian football club based in Klagenfurt (Celovec), Carinthia, currently playing in the 3rd tier Austrian Regionalliga Central. It was founded in 1970 by members of the Klagenfurt Slovene secondary school (Gymnasium) around Valentin Inzko.

After the re-introduction of the Regional League Central, SAK won the 1995 championship and was promoted to the First League. Nevertheless, the team was again relegated one year later to the Regional League, where they have played until 2001, from 2002 until 2003 and from 2005 until 2015. From 2001 until 2002 und from 2003 until 2005 the team played in the "Kaerntner Landesliga" ("Kaerntner Liga").

Current squad 2014/15

Staff and board members

 Groundsman: Erhard Stuck
 President:  Mark Wieser
 Secretary:  Karin Blajs
 Treasurer:  Gerlinde Blajs Nadrag

External links
 http://www.sak.at/  Official Website

Association football clubs established in 1970
Klagenfurt, SAK
1970 establishments in Austria
Sport in Klagenfurt